"Clinging Vine" is a song released by Bobby Vinton in 1964. The song spent 8 weeks on the Billboard Hot 100 chart, peaking at No. 17, while reaching No. 2 on Billboards Pop-Standards Singles chart, No. 14 on the Cash Box Top 100, No. 11 on Canada's RPM "Top 40-5s", and No. 9 on Canada's CHUM Hit Parade.

Chart performance

References

1964 songs
1964 singles
Bobby Vinton songs
Epic Records singles
Songs with lyrics by Earl Shuman
Songs with music by Leon Carr